Tasos Tasiopoulos (born 25 April 1968) is a Greek former professional footballer.

During his club career, Tasiopoulos played for Charavgiakos, Athinaikos, PAOK, Paniliakos, and Fostiras. Tasiopoulos joined Paniliakos from PAOK before the 1998–99 season.

Following his playing career, Tasiopoulos became a football manager. He has managed Ilioupoli and Rouf in the Gamma Ethniki.

References

1968 births
Living people
Athinaikos F.C. players
PAOK FC players
Paniliakos F.C. players
Fostiras F.C. players
Super League Greece players
Association football defenders
Greek football managers
Ilioupoli F.C. managers
Rouf F.C. managers
Footballers from Athens
Greek footballers